Saleh Al-Fawzan (born 1933) is an Islamic scholar and has been a member of several high religious bodies in Saudi Arabia. He is considered to be the most senior scholar of Islam in Saudi Arabia.

His surname is also transliterated Al-Fozan or Al-Fawzaan. He is also known as Saleh Ibn Fawzan Ibn Abdullah, Saleh Ibn Fawzan al-Fawzan, Saalih Ibn Fowzaan Ibn 'Abdullaah Ibn Fowzaan. Biography
According to his official biography at fatwa-online.com, Fawzan is from the family of Fawzan from the people/tribe of ash-Shamaasiyyah. His father reportedly died when he was young, and he was subsequently brought up by his extended family. He learned the Quran, the basics of reading and writing from the Imam of his hometown mosque.

Education
Fawzan studied in the state school in ash-Qamariyah when it opened 1948. In 1950 he completed his studies at the Faysaliyyah school in Buraydah and subsequently was appointed a teacher at the school. Fawzan joined the Educational Institute in Buraydah when it opened in 1952, and graduated from it in 1956. He was a student at Imam Muhammad ibn Saud Islamic University in Riyadh, where he initially studied at the faculty of Sharia, graduating in 1960, before  earning a master's and doctorate in Fiqh.

Career
According to fatwa-online.com, after the completion of his doctorate, he became a teacher at the faculty of Shari'ah at the Imam Muhammad educational institute in Riyadh before being transferred to the Department for Higher Studies within the Faculty of the Principles of the Religion (usool ad-deen''). He was later the head of Saudi Arabia's Supreme Court of Justice, where he was appointed the head. He then returned to teaching there after his period of headship came to an end.

As of 2013, he was a member of the Council of Senior Scholars, Saudi Arabia's highest religious body, which advises the king on religious matters. He is also currently a member of the Permanent Committee for Islamic Research and Issuing Fatwas, a committee of the Council of Senior Scholars. The Council issues rulings in Islamic jurisprudence (fiqh) and prepares research papers for the Council of Senior Scholars. He is one of the major scholars on the Nur Ala al-Darb radio program, which has been described as "one of the oldest and most famous programs broadcast on the Quran radio channel, where a number of major scholars answer questions and give fatwas."

Controversial statements
Al-Fawzan's views on slavery—given in lectures recorded on cassette—came to light and caused some controversy in 2003. In the tape he was quoted as saying, "Slavery is a part of Islam (in war context) ... Slavery is part of jihad, and jihad will remain as long there is Islam." As for the modernist interpretation that Islam totally abolished slavery, he dismissed its exponents saying, "They are ignorant, not scholars.  ... Whoever says such things is an infidel."

In March 2014, Al-Fawzan denied that he issued a fatwa banning 'all you can eat' open-buffets, claiming he only said that open-buffets should identify the quantity so that people don't end up buying the "unknown". "It is attributed to me that I prohibited the buffet and this is an apparent lie motivated by fantasy and fabrication," Al-Fawzan said in the statement posted on his website. "The fact is that I was asked about a phenomenon in some restaurants where owners tell their customers: eat what you like from the displayed food and pay a lump sum. I said: This is unknown and the unknown cannot be sold until it is defined and identified," the statement added.

Saleh al-Fawzan was given attention in Western media again in May 2016 after he declared taking photos prohibited in a video published by the Middle East Media Research Institute on  April 17, 2016. According to The Independent, "Speaking in a televised broadcast, Sheikh Saleh Bin Fawzan Al-Fawzan was asked about "a new trend of taking pictures with cats" which "has been spreading among people who want to be like the Westerners". The sheikh initially appears incredulous, asking: "What?! What do you mean pictures with cats?" He then declares: "Taking pictures is prohibited. The cats don't matter here." When asked again about the "new trend", he says: "Explain this trend to me. Taking pictures is prohibited if not for a necessity - not with cats, not with dogs, not with wolves, not with anything."

Feminism activist Hala Al-Dosari (fellow of Radcliff Institute at Harvard) and Abdullah Alaoudh (senior fellow of Georgetown University and son of Salman al-Awdah) claim Saleh al-Fawzan is treated like a father figure by Mohammed Bin Salman.  A month before the murder of Jamal Khashoggi, al-Fawzan proclaimed a threatening fatwa calling for killing of critics of the Saudi government.

Human Rights Watch has attributed hate speech by Saleh al-Fawzan towards Shia and rafida when he called these groups "brothers of Satan" and specifically about a faction of Shia followers as "unbelievers" who "lie about God, his prophet, and the consensus of Muslim". Hala Al-Dosari also claims that al-Fawzan considers Islamic minority sects to be heretics.

References

External links

Bio
Biography in Arabic
A biography of the Sheikh 
Another biography of the Shiekh

1933 births
Living people
20th-century Muslim scholars of Islam
Critics of Shia Islam
Salafi Quietists
Imam Muhammad ibn Saud Islamic University alumni
Saudi Arabian Salafis
Critics of atheism